Eddie Jack "Scooter" Tucker (born November 18, 1966) is an American former Major League Baseball catcher.  Originally drafted by the San Francisco Giants in 1988, Tucker broke into the big leagues with the Houston Astros in 1992 and also played parts of the 1993 and 1995 seasons with the Astros.  In 1995 the Astros traded him to the Cleveland Indians for pitcher Matt Williams. He played college baseball for Delta State University.

References

External links

1966 births
Living people
Houston Astros players
Cleveland Indians players
Baseball players from Mississippi
Sportspeople from Greenville, Mississippi
Major League Baseball catchers
Everett Giants players
Clinton Giants players
San Jose Giants players
Shreveport Captains players
Tucson Toros players
Richmond Braves players
Omaha Royals players
Minor league baseball managers